Frank, Franklin or Francis Underwood may refer to:
 Francis H. Underwood (1825–1894), American writer, founder of The Atlantic, and consul to Scotland
 Frank Underwood (English musician), folk and blues musician
 Frank Livingston Underwood (1844–1918), American banker and railroad developer
 Franklin Underwood, also known as Frank Underwood, American musical theater songwriter
 Frank Underwood (House of Cards), the fictional protagonist of the American television drama series House of Cards

See also 
 Francis (disambiguation)
 Frank (disambiguation)
 Franklin (disambiguation)
 Underwood (disambiguation)